The Districts of British India were administrative units of the Government of the British Raj or Indian Empire. Districts were generally subdivisions of the provinces and divisions of British India

History
Districts, often known as zillas in vernacular, were established as subdivisions of the provinces (praanths in vernacular) and divisions of British India that were under one of the three Presidencies.

Most of the districts that were created during the British Raj became Districts of India after the independence of India.

Historical districts
The following list includes only districts of British India that became extinguished or that saw major changes in their history:

Districts in the Madras Presidency
Anantapur district
Bellary district (including parts of Present-day Kurnool district)
Chingleput District
Coimbatore District (Madras Presidency)
Cuddapah district
Ganjam district (including present-day Gajapati district and parts of Srikakulam district)
Godavari District
Krishna district (including Guntur district)
Kurnool district (including parts of present-day Prakasam district)
Madura District (Madras Presidency)
Malabar District
Nellore district (including parts of present-day Prakasam and Tiruvallur districts)
North Arcot
Salem District
South Arcot District
South Canara
Tanjore District
Tinnevely District
Trichinopoly District
Vizagapatam district (including Vizianagaram district)

Districts in the Bengal Presidency
Bakerganj District
Bassein District
Champaran District
Garo Hills district
Jungle Mahals
Jungle Terry
Khasi and Jaintia Hills
Lushai Hills District
Manbhum District
Naga Hills District
Purnia District
Shahabad district
Singhbhum District
Tipperah District

Districts in the Bombay Presidency
East Khandesh
Kaladgi District
Khandesh District
Upper Sind Frontier District
West Khandesh

Other districts
Bhilsa District
Chanderi District
Delhi District
Ellichpur District
Garhwal District
Hazara District
Isagarh District
Kumaon District
Lyallpur District
Merwara District
Montgomery District
Muhamdi District
Nimar District
North Bareilly District
Quetta-Pishin District
Shahpur District
Sironj District
Thal-Chotiali
Wun District
Neemuch District
Peshawar District

See also
List of districts in India
Subdivisions of British India
Territorial evolution of the British Empire

References

External links
Pamphlets issued by the India office and by other British and Indian governmental agencies, relating to the government of India, and to various political, economic, and social questions concerning it and Burma